Miners’ Lung: A History of Dust Disease in British Coal Mining by Arthur McIvor and Ronald Johnston is a 2007 book which is part of the Studies in Labour History series. The book argues that British coal mining is the "classic dangerous trade", and even those that escape the immediate dangers of the pit (mine collapses, explosions, suffocation) may be subject to years of pain, laboured breathing and eventual death. McIvor and Johnston relate the story of how the dust created by the picks, hammers, and pneumatic tools "crept deep into the lungs of the otherwise powerfully built, healthy workers, eventually incapacitating them, ruining their bodies and killing them".

See also
Big Coal: The Dirty Secret Behind America's Energy Future (2006)
Boys in the Pits: Child Labour in Coal Mines (2000)
Coal River (2008)
King Coal (1917)
Moving Mountains: How One Woman and Her Community Won Justice From Big Coal (2007)

References

2007 non-fiction books
English non-fiction books
Books about labor history
Works about the history of mining
Coal mining in the United Kingdom